Life for Rent is the second studio album by English singer Dido, released by Arista Records on 29 September 2003. The album was produced by her brother Rollo Armstrong and American songwriter Rick Nowels. Work on the album began in mid-2002. It was certified 9× Platinum by the BPI, and sold over 12 million copies worldwide, making it the fourth best-selling album worldwide of 2003. The album became the seventh best-selling album of the 2000s in the United Kingdom, making Dido the only singer to have two albums in the top 10 list.

As of 2015, Life for Rent is the 34th best-selling album in UK chart history. In 2019 it was listed the 15th best-selling album of the 21st century in the UK.

Composition
Life for Rents first track and lead single "White Flag" begins with a lone synth-chord reminiscent of Sinéad O'Connor's "Nothing Compares 2 U". In the song, the protagonist is unwilling to give up, even if they know it is over. It features "multi-layered" sound, delicate piano outro, and strings. In battle, a white flag signals surrender. By stating there will be "No white flag," she indicates she will not give up on the relationship. The second track "Stoned" has a dance vibe, bringing to mind David Bowie circa Outside (1995).  The title track, "Life for Rent", has emotional gravity and graceful melody. The song opens with an acoustic guitar, keeping the guitar in and giving the tune a hip-hop beat. "Nothing I have is truly mine" she repeats at the conclusion. "Mary’s in India" is a reflective song about a friend who moves abroad, as the title suggests, and the void her departure creates in those she leaves behind. The fifth track "See You When You're 40" is a somber and melodic ballad with a touch of symphonic air, featuring "quasi" trip hop beat. 'And I've seen, tonight, what I'd been warned about / I'm gonna leave, tonight, before I change my mind,' she sings.

The sixth track "Don't Leave Home" sounds like she is picking herself up again although she speaks of shutting the blinds and closing the door, but she revealed that it's about drug addiction. The "narrator" of the song is the drug. Like a controlling lover, the drug takes over the user's life until he does not even want to leave home. "Who Makes You Feel" is a trip-pop, soulful and tender track. "Sand in My Shoes" talks about not having time, while the bridge get a bit dance-house. "Do You Have a Little Time" features lush strings and hip-hop back-beats. "This Land Is Mine" is a reflective piece that according to PopMatters, "could have Travis or Coldplay recording it with big grins on their faces. Simplistic and sparse, the song sounds just a bit like Olivia Newton-John in the early seventies, according to them. "See the Sun" sees Dido swoop in as savior for a broken heart, classified as a "mini-anthem that has all the right items in their proper places."

Singles
"White Flag" was released as the lead single from the album on 7 July 2003 in the United States and on 1 September 2003 in the United Kingdom. The song was well received by critics who reviewed the album. It became a major worldwide hit, reaching number one in Australia and Europe. It peaked at number two in the United Kingdom, being held off the top spot by the Black Eyed Peas' "Where Is the Love?", and became her highest-charting single to date there. On the UK year-end chart for 2003, the song ranked at number 12. It peaked at number 18 on the Billboard Hot 100 and became her second top-20 single on the chart. It reached number two on the US Billboard Hot Adult Contemporary Tracks listing and stayed on the chart for 66 weeks. The song references a past relationship with Bob Page. In an interview with British newspaper The Sun, Dido said "the song is an apology to Page for breaking his heart. 'It was a big decision not to get married...". The video featured the TV actor David Boreanaz. The song ranked on Blender's list "The 500 Greatest Songs Since You Were Born" at number 317. "Life for Rent" was released as the second single from the album on 1 December 2003. It peaked within the top ten in the UK Singles Chart and the Irish Singles Chart. The music video featured Dido singing in several rooms, and was directed by Sophie Muller.

"Don't Leave Home", written by Dido and her brother, was released as the third single via digital download on 10 April 2004, followed by a physical release two days later. The main theme of the song is the use of drugs, where the drugs "sing" to the consumer: "When I've been here for just one day / You'll already miss me if I go away / So close the blinds and shut the door / You won't need other friends anymore". The song debuted and peaked at number 25 in the UK. The track "Stoned" was remixed by Deep Dish and issued as the B-side to the single; this remix had previously reached number one on the Billboard Hot Dance/Club Songs chart in January 2004. "Sand in My Shoes" was released as the fourth and final single from the album; in the US, it was serviced to radio on 23 August 2004, while in the UK, it was issued commercially on 13 September 2004. The remixes became another US club hit, reaching number one on the Billboard Hot Dance Club Play chart. "Sand in My Shoes" debuted and peaked at number 29 in the UK.

Critical reception

According to review aggregator Metacritic, the album has received generally positive reviews, scoring 69 out of 100 points based on 12 reviews. Jason MacNeil, from PopMatters, gave a very positive review, finishing with: "this record seems to outweigh the previous album in terms of quality and depth". Alexis Petridis wrote "It would be nice to report that Dido's second album is strong enough to reveal her detractors as snobs, who hate the notion that her music appeals to 'ordinary' people ... Sadly, it proves a little more complicated than that".

Barry Walters of Rolling Stone declared "Like No Angel ... isn't groundbreaking, but it has its own kind of integrity. "Life for Rent doesn't offer anything that drastically different from Dido's debut album [No Angel], ... she's unassuming and gentle, but her songs are so melodic and atmospheric they easily work their way into the subconscious" was the review by Stephen Thomas Erlewine, from Allmusic. Andrew Lynch, from entertainment.ie noted: "Life For Rent is no masterpiece, but it has the same kind of sweet, unassuming, girl-next-door charm that made its predecessor such a smash hit". Derryck Strachan, BBC Music reviewer wrote " ... she treads a fine line between credibility and popularity ... But, she hasn't put a foot wrong with this album. On the positive side that means more well-crafted folk-pop tunes, on the negative side she hasn't moved forward", also said "Although Dido played a significant part in older brother Rollo's band, ... Faithless, it would be misleading to say that the groups success brought her fame".

Commercial performance
Life for Rent is the fastest selling album by a woman recording artist, passing five million sales mark in just two weeks. It sold 102,500 on the first day, and 400,351 in the first week. According to the IFPI, it was the fourth best-selling album worldwide of 2003. Also, according to the BPI, Life for Rent was the best-selling album of 2003 in United Kingdom; and the seventh best-selling album between 2000 and 2009 in the country. The album spent ten weeks at the top of the UK albums chart. It remained on the chart for 54 weeks. Also, spent 18 non-consecutive weeks at number one on the European Top 100 Albums chart. In the United States, Life for Rent debuted and peaked at number four. By October 2003, the album had sold over a million and half copies. In Australia the album debuted at number one on the ARIA albums chart, being certified platinum (70,000) copies in its first week. It was one of the biggest selling albums of 2003 and went on to be certified six times platinum for sales of over 420,000. With this, Dido matched the huge success of her previous effort, No Angel. Dido's "Life for Rent Tour" was taken around the world in 2004. The album was nominated for "Best British Album" at the 2004 BRIT Awards along with Daniel Bedingfield's Gotta Get Thru This, Blur's Think Tank and The Coral's Magic and Medicine, but they were all beaten by The Darkness's Permission to Land. "White Flag" was awarded the 2004 Ivor Novello Award in the category International Hit of the Year. Also, in the same year, Life for Rent earned Dido's first Grammy nomination, at the 46th Grammy Awards, in the category Best Female Pop Vocal Performance for the song "White Flag".

Track listing
Credits adapted from the album's liner notes.

All tracks produced by Dido and Rollo, except where noted.

Personnel
Credits adapted from the album's liner notes.
Dido Armstrong – vocals
Pauline Taylor – background vocals
Rusty Anderson – guitar
Dave Randall – guitar
Richard J. Parfitt – guitar
Rick Nowels – guitar, keyboards
Adam Zimmon – acoustic guitar
Paul Herman – acoustic guitar
Aubrey Nunn – bass guitar
Sister Bliss – keyboards, piano
Mark Bates – harmonium, keyboards, percussion
Carlos Paucar – percussion
Mako Sakamoto – drums
Andy Treacy – drums

Production
Producers – D. Armstrong, Rollo Armstrong, R. Nowels
Programmers – D. Armstrong, Sister Bliss, DJ Pnut, Steve Sidelynk

Charts

Weekly charts

Year-end charts

Decade-end charts

All-time charts

Certifications and sales

See also
 List of best-selling albums by women
 List of UK Albums Chart number ones of the 2000s
 List of best-selling albums of the 2000s (decade) in the United Kingdom
 List of best-selling albums of the 2000s (century) in the United Kingdom
 Live at Brixton Academy (Dido album)

References

External links
Dido official website
Life for Rent at Dido.com

2003 albums
Dido (singer) albums
Cheeky Records albums
Albums produced by Rick Nowels
Albums produced by Rollo Armstrong
Folk rock albums by English artists
Albums recorded at The Church Studios